Cubi XXVI is an abstract sculpture by David Smith, in the National Gallery of Art Sculpture Garden in Washington, D.C., USA.

Constructed of stainless steel on January 12, 1965, it was purchased in 1978. It was on loan to the White House. The sculpture is a part of Smith's Cubi series.

See also
 List of public art in Washington, D.C., Ward 2

References

External links
Cubi XXVI

1965 sculptures
Abstract sculptures in Washington, D.C.
Collections of the National Gallery of Art
Cubist sculptures
Modernist sculpture
National Gallery of Art Sculpture Garden
Outdoor sculptures in Washington, D.C.
Sculptures by David Smith
Steel sculptures in Washington, D.C.